Opytne is a rural settlement in Bakhmut Raion (district) in Donetsk Oblast of eastern Ukraine, at 64.7 km NNE from the centre of Donetsk city. Since October 2022, it would be under the control of the Russian Armed Forces.

Opytne was shelled in 2015 During the War in Donbas (2014–2022) but no casualties were reported.

On 13 October 2022, the Donetsk People's Republic announced that "troops of the DPR and LPR, with support from the Russian Armed Forces, "liberated" Opytne and Ivanhrad."
However, Armed forces of Ukraine have not confirmed yet this claim.On November 11 2022, Opytne was captured by DPR and Russian forces.

Demographics
In 2001, the settlement had 1951 inhabitants.

References

Rural settlements in Donetsk Oblast